The 2004 World Men's Curling Championship (branded as 2004 Ford World Men's Curling Championship for sponsorship reasons) was held at the Gavlerinken in Gävle, Sweden from April 17–25, 2004.

The tournament was held in conjunction with the 2004 World Women's Curling Championship and the 2004 World Senior Curling Championships.

Teams

Round-robin standings

Round-robin results

Draw 1
April 17, 2004 13:30

Draw 2
April 18, 2004 08:00

Draw 3
April 18, 2004 16:00

Draw 4
April 19, 2004 08:30

Draw 5
April 19, 2004 19:00

Draw 6
April 20, 2004 14:00

Draw 7
April 21, 2004 08:30

Draw 8
April 21, 2004 19:00

Draw 9
April 22, 2004 13:00

Playoffs

Brackets

Semi-final
April 25, 2004 13:30

Bronze medal game
April 25, 2004 11:00

Gold medal game
April 25, 2004 15:00

Player percentages

References
 

Ford World Mens Curling Championship, 2004
Ford World Men's Curling Championship
World Men's Curling Championship
April 2004 sports events in Europe
Sports competitions in Gävle
International curling competitions hosted by Sweden